The American Academy of Psychiatry and the Law (AAPL) is a professional organization in the field of forensic psychiatry.

History and organization
AAPL was founded in 1969. It currently has more than 1,500 members in North America and around the world.

It publishes the quarterly Journal of the American Academy of Psychiatry and the Law. The Academy's Ethics guidelines for the practice of forensic psychiatry form the basis of the guidelines of the Canadian Academy of Psychiatry and the Law. They have also debated the medical ethics of psychiatrists testifying in death-penalty cases.

Presidents
 Emily A. Keram, MD         2015-2016
 Graham Glancy, MB          2014-2015
 Robert Weinstock, MD       2013-2014
 Debra A. Pinals, MD        2012-2013
 Charles L. Scott, MD 2011-2012
 Peter Ash, MD 2010-2011
 Stephen B. Billick, MD 2009-2010
 Patricia R. Recupero, MD, JD 2008-2009
 Jeffrey S. Janofsky, M.D. 2007-2008
 Alan R. Felthous, M.D. 2006-2007
 Robert I. Simon, M.D. 2005-2006
 Robert T.M. Phillips, M.D., Ph.D. 2004-2005
 Robert Wettstein, M.D. 2003-2004
 Roy J. O'Shaughnessy, M.D. 2002-2003
 Larry Strasburger, M.D. 2001-2002
 Jeffrey Metzner, M.D. 2000-2001
 Thomas G. Gutheil, M.D. 1999-2000
 Larry R. Faulkner, M.D. 1998-1999
 Renée L. Binder, M.D. 1997-1998
 Ezra E. H. Griffith, M.D. 1996-1997
 Paul S. Appelbaum, M.D. 1995-1996
 Park E. Dietz, M.D., Ph.D., M.P.H. 1994-1995
 John M. Bradford, M.B. 1993-1994
 Howard V. Zonana, M.D. 1992-1993
 Kathleen M. Quinn, M.D. 1991-1992
 Richard T. Rada, M.D. 1990-1991
 Joseph D. Bloom, M.D. 1989-1990
 William H. Reid, M.D. 1988-1989
 Richard Rosner, M.D. 1987-1988
 J. Richard Ciccone, M.D. 1986-1987
 Selwyn M. Smith, M.D. 1985-1986
 Phillip J. Resnick, M.D. 1984-1985
 Loren H. Roth, M.D. 1983-1984
 Abraham L. Halpern, M.D. 1982-1983
 Stanley L. Portnow, M.D. 1981-1982
 Herbert E. Thomas, M.D. 1980-1981
 Nathan I. Sidley, M.D. 1979-1980
 Irwin N. Perr, M.D. 1978-1979
 Gerald J. Sarwer-Foner, M.D. 1975-1977
 Seymour L. Pollack, M.D. 1973-1975
 Robert L. Sadoff, M.D. 1971-1973
 Jonas R. Rappeport, M.D. 1969-1971

Selected publications
 Rosner, Richard (1982). Critical Issues in American Psychiatry and the Law, Volume 1. Thomas, 
 Rosner, Richard (1985). Critical Issues in American Psychiatry and the Law, Volume 2. Thomas,

See also
 Journal of the American Academy of Psychiatry and the Law

References

External links
 American Academy of Psychiatry and the Law

Forensic psychiatry
Mental health organizations in Connecticut